Ramon Llambard, Ramon Lambard, Raimon Lambard or Raimundo Lambardo (died c. 1195) was a medieval architect and master of works active in Catalonia in the 12th century. He is most notable for his design of La Seu d'Urgell Cathedral.

Bibliography (in Spanish) 
Joan-Albert Adell, Pere Beseran, Albert Sierra i Albert Villaró, (2000), La catedral de la Seu d'Urgell, Manresa.
Josep Puig i Cadafalch, (1918), Santa Maria de la Seu d’Urgell: Estudi monogràfic, Barcelona.

1190s deaths
Year of birth unknown
12th-century Spanish architects
Romanesque architects
Medieval Catalan artists
12th-century Catalan people